WIPB, virtual channel 49 (UHF digital channel 19), is a Public Broadcasting Service (PBS) member television station licensed to Muncie, Indiana, United States. Owned by Ball State University, it is a sister station to National Public Radio (NPR) member WBST (92.1 FM). The two stations share studios at the E. F. Ball Communication Building on the university's campus in northwestern Muncie; WIPB's transmitter is located on County Road 50 in rural southern Delaware County (south of Cowan).

History

UHF channel 49 in Central Indiana
The UHF channel 49 allocation in Central Indiana was originally occupied by WLBC-TV, which signed on the air on June 14, 1953, as a primary CBS affiliate with secondary affiliations with ABC, NBC and DuMont. The station was founded by Don Burton, owner of Muncie radio station WLBC (1340 AM, now WMUN). During the late 1950s, the station was also briefly affiliated with the NTA Film Network. WLBC-TV dropped CBS programming in the early 1960s, becoming a primary NBC and secondary ABC affiliate. Burton expanded the WLBC radio facility on 29th Street in southeast Muncie and constructed a  tower outside the building.

To make matters worse, WLBC-TV was hampered by low viewership as only a small percentage of Central Indiana area television sets were even capable of receiving UHF stations since set manufacturers were not required to equip televisions with UHF tuners until the Federal Communications Commission (FCC) passed the All-Channel Receiver Act in 1961; even then, UHF tuners were not included on all newer sets until 1964 and the retail prices for standalone UHF tuners at the time were high. The station eventually started a news department in the 1960s.

WIPB station history

Burton sold the UHF channel 49 license in 1971 to Eastern Indiana Community Television, a local ad hoc nonprofit group led by Gretchen Huff and Sunny Spurgeon, which had been working to apply for a license to operate an educational television station in Muncie. The group converted it into a non-commercial educational license, and changed the station's call letters to WIPB (for "Indiana Public Broadcasting"). Eastern Indiana Community Television subsequently sold the license to Ball State University, which signed on the station on the afternoon of October 31, 1971 as a PBS member station; as part of PBS' Program Differentiation Plan, the network's programming was divided between it and two other PBS members in the Indianapolis market—WFYI (channel 20) and Bloomington-based WTIU (channel 30); they were joined in 1992 by WTBU in Indianapolis (channel 69, now Daystar owned-and-operated religious station WDTI). WIPB, as a non-commercial outlet, briefly operated a news department during the 1980s, producing a daily newscast titled On-Line 49.

On November 1, 2020, WIPB rebranded as Ball State PBS.

Programming
WIPB's claim to fame is having been the station that The Joy of Painting, a half-hour art program hosted by Bob Ross, originated from (except for its first season, which was recorded at WNVC in Falls Church, Virginia) from mid-1983 to 1994. The station also produces Connections Live!, a half-hour weekly magazine program that focuses on the people and places of interest in Central Indiana that connect people to their communities; the program has won four Regional Emmy Awards since 2002.

Trivia
The jingle heard in WIPB's station identifications from the late 1980s was "Logo #7", a stock track composed by Vic Sepanski for the Omnimusic library. It was also utilized by WPSU-TV (then WPSX) around the same time period. As an example, this ID can be found on older recordings of The Joy of Painting.

Technical information

Subchannels
The station's digital signal is multiplexed:

Analog-to-digital conversion
WIPB began broadcasting a digital signal on October 31, 2005. The station shut down its analog signal, over UHF channel 49, on February 18, 2009, the day after the original target date for full-power television stations in the United States to transition from analog to digital broadcasts under federal mandate (which Congress had moved the previous month to June 12). The station's digital signal continued to broadcast on its pre-transition UHF channel 23. Through the use of PSIP, digital television receivers display the station's virtual channel as its former UHF analog channel 49.

Following the transition, WIPB decommissioned its original East 29th Street tower that formerly occupied its analog transmitter, which was dismantled in January 2013; its digital signal operates from a separate  tower located to its south.

References

External links
Official website
WIPB-TV Documentary Video Collection in the Ball State University Libraries Digital Media Repository
Newslink Indiana

PBS member stations
Ball State University
Muncie, Indiana
Television channels and stations established in 1971
1971 establishments in Indiana
IPB